Creature Academy is an all-ages/science fiction/fantasy digital comic series created by Kevin Hanna, that ran for four issues and was published in a collected edition for the first time in 2013.

In 2008, LeftJet announced that they had taken steps for a possible future film adaptation; The film, The Creature Academy, is currently in preproduction.

Plot
Creature Academy tells the story of rebellious teen, Wes Mendes, who has lived his life on the run with his mother. Once she is kidnapped by ghost-like specters, they then return for him. He must now hide in the under-city; where the human and the magic worlds intersect. There Wes joins a team of students and their mythical creatures.

The events of the books predominantly take place in Seattle, Washington. 
 The Undercity: The hidden city underneath Seattle where magic users and mythical creatures hide from the top world
 The Academy: The school where magic users are trained to summon and tame mythical creatures

Characters
Wes Mendes is the protagonist, a young teen learning how to live in a world of adults and magic.

The character's name, like all the characters in the book, are from two directors, like Wes Anderson and Sam Mendes.

Collected editions
The series has been collected into a hardcover volume Creature Academy  in 2014 by Red 5 Comics.

Awards
Creature Academy graphic novel won the Moonbeam Award and Graphic Novel of the Year at Book Expo America by ForeWord magazine.

Film adaptation

The film Creature Academy is currently in the early stages of pre-production.

Notes

External links

 
 Clockwork Girl's Kevin Hanna kickstarts 'Creature Academy'. The Punkettes, September 3, 2012
 
 

2013 comics debuts